ISNA Canada is a non-profit organization in Canada that offers many programs and services to the Canadian community at large. During the COVID-19 pandemic, ISNA Canada re-adjusted its services and programs to serve the community through virtual programs and drive-thru community experiences. ISNA has three centers in Canada, located in Mississauga, Toronto and Yellowknife.

ISNA Services and Programs
ISNA Canada strives to help Muslims put their faith into action by offering a variety of volunteer, educational and leadership opportunities. Some of these opportunities include: a monthly food bank that serves 600 families per month, programs like Walk the Talk that engage youth in community service, weekend Islamic and Arabic schools, Quran classes, kids camps and much more. With ISNA Canada's vision for a community powered by youth, they are always looking for new ways to empower and energize young people to be catalysts for positive changes in the community.

Some of the other services that ISNA Canada provides to support Muslims include marriage services, funeral services, Islamically-integrated psychotherapy and mental health counselling, Halal certification and Islamic bookstore.

ISNA Canada's Response to COVID-19 
ISNA Canada was quick in its response to the COVID-19 pandemic with success in four different programs and services: the ISNA Canada Foodbank, the frontline workers meal program, the relief kits and the drive-thru Ramadan meals.

In mid-March ISNA Canada instigated the creation of the Canadian Muslim Response Network with over 40 organization and distributed 1420 hygiene kits, 1527 food kits and 3810 fruits and vegetables to those most vulnerable during the pandemic including seniors, single mothers of young children, immuno-compromised individuals and people with disabilities.

The Foodbank usually serves families inside the Islamic Center of Canada. As a result of the pandemic the foodbank team devised an alternative drive thru model to serve those in need. Volunteers wore masks and gloves and beneficiaries remained in their cars to limit contact and physical interaction. They would simply drive up, have their information quickly verified and receive a grocery gift card. During the Ramadan distribution they served up to 700 families.

On March 21, 2020 ISNA Canada collaborated with local restaurants to provide free meals to healthcare front-line workers. The program started with restaurants in the Halton and Peel regions but eventually reached Toronto, Waterloo and Windsor. After a month's time the program was extended to provide meals to essential workers, including police officers, paramedics and shelters. The program ran for 2 months and served over 8000 meals.

Ramadan is a month of community and gathering for Muslims, however, the pandemic prevented that from happening this year. ISNA Canada decided to utilize the foodbank drive thru model to provide drive thru iftars (the meal for breaking the fast) and suhoors (the meal eaten early morning before starting the fast). There was an average of 1000 and 700 meals served at each iftar and suhoor, respectively. Throughout the month of Ramadan the Premier, MPs and MPPs attended these drive thru iftars and served meals to community members. The drive thru model was also successfully carried through to the Eid celebrations that commemorated the end of Ramadan, where the Mayor of Mississauga was present.

Controversy
An audit of ISNA Canada in 2011 found that only a quarter of the funds donated to the organisation went to help the poor. Charity donations were misdirected to private businesses.

On September 21, 2013, the Canada Revenue Agency revoked the charitable tax-exempt status of the ISNA Development Foundation, a charity that operated out of ISNA Canada's headquarters. ISNA Canada was not affected by the move.

On September 12, 2018, CRA suspended the organization for one year and ordered the charity to pay a penalty of $550,000.  The CRA determined that "the society’s resources may have, directly or indirectly, been used the support the political efforts of Jamaat-e-Islami and/or its armed wing Hizbul Mujahideen."

The U.S.-based Islamic Society of North America, a distinct organization, noted association with ISNA Canada but emphasized its complete separation of governance, accounting, and auditing.

References

External links
 ISNA Canada Elementary School

1983 establishments in Ontario
Islamic organizations based in Canada
Islam in Toronto